The 2017 National Dreamtime Awards was the inaugural National Dreamtime Awards event, held on 17 November 2017 at The Star, Sydney and were hosted by Luke Carroll and Shari Lee Niliwil Sebbo. The Awards program was broadcast nationally on NITV on 20 November 2017.

2017 Dreamtime Award recipients
The following individuals and organisations were awarded prizes in their various categories:
 Dreamtime Person of the Year – Clinton Pryor
 Dreamtime Lifetime Achievement – Rachel Perkins
 Dreamtime Elder – Uncle Bill Yidumduma Harney
 Male Music Artist – Gawurra
 Female Music Artist – Jessica Mauboy
 Male Actor – Rob Collins
 Female Actor – Shari Sebbens
 Media Person of the Year – Stan Grant
 Male Sportsperson – Eddie Betts
 Female Sportsperson – Ashleigh Barty
 International Sportsperson – Patty Mills
 Best New Sports Talent – Josh Addo-Carr 
 Community Person – Jeffery Amatto
 Business of the Year – Something Wild
 Community Organisation – Miromaa
 Teacher of the Year – Nathan Towney
 Institute of the Year – ACU Yalbalinga Indigenous Higher Education Unit
 Student of the Year – Jessa Rogers

References

External links

2017
Indigenous Australia-related lists
2017 in Australian music